Eric Philpott (1946 – 25 December 2015) was an Irish Gaelic footballer who played as a right wing-forward at senior level for the Cork county team.

Born in the Lough, Cork, Philpott arrived on the inter-county scene at the age of sixteen when he first linked up with the Cork minor team, before later joining the under-21 side. He made his senior debut during the 1965 championship. Philpott went on to play a key role over the next few years and won two Munster medals. He was an All-Ireland runner-up on one occasion.

At club level Philpott played with both St Finbarr's and Bandon.

Throughout his inter-county career, Philpott made 11 championship appearances for Cork. His retirement came following the conclusion of the 1969 championship.

References

1946 births
2015 deaths
Cork inter-county Gaelic footballers
Irish schoolteachers
St Finbarr's Gaelic footballers
UCC Gaelic footballers